Everything I Have Is Yours can refer to:

"Everything I Have Is Yours" (song), a 1933 popular song by Burton Lane and Harold Adamson
Everything I Have Is Yours (album), a compilation of songs recorded by Billy Eckstine, released in 1994
Everything I Have Is Yours (film), a 1952 musical film directed by Robert Z. Leonard